Rhanteriopsis is a genus of Middle Eastern plants in the tribe Inuleae within the family Asteraceae.

 Species
 Rhanteriopsis bombycina (Boiss. & Hausskn.) Rauschert - Iran
 Rhanteriopsis lanuginosa (DC.) Rauschert - Syria, Lebanon
 Rhanteriopsis microcephala (Boiss.) Rauschert - Syria, Lebanon
 Rhanteriopsis puberula (Boiss. & Hausskn.) Rauschert - Iran

References

Asteraceae genera
Inuleae